Etmopterus dislineatus, sometimes called the lined lanternshark, is a shark of the family Etmopteridae found in the central Coral Sea at depths of between 590 and 800 m.  Its length is up to 45 cm.

Reproduction is ovoviviparous.

References

 
 Compagno, Dando, & Fowler, Sharks of the World, Princeton University Press, New Jersey 2005 

Etmopterus
Taxa named by Peter R. Last
Taxa named by George H. Burgess
Taxa named by Bernard Séret
Fish described in 2002